Petra Kvitová was the defending champion, but she was defeated in the final by Simona Halep 6–2, 6–2.

Seeds
The top two seeds receive a bye into the second round.

Draw

Finals

Top half

Bottom half

Qualifying

Seeds

Qualifiers

Lucky losers

Qualifying draw

First qualifier

Second qualifier

Third qualifier

Fourth qualifier

Fifth qualifier

Sixth qualifier

External links
 WTA tournament draws

2013 WTA Tour
Singles